ExxonMobil's Baytown Refinery is a major oil refinery named after and located in Baytown, Texas. The site first opened in 1919 and was originally operated by the Humble Oil Company. Today, it is the largest employer in the city. The plant takes up  of land next to the Houston Ship Channel.

The Baytown Refinery is the second-largest refinery in the United States by production, after the nearby Port Arthur Refinery. Baytown is also ExxonMobil's second largest refinery, only trailing Exxon's Jurong Island refinery in Singapore.

On December 23, 2021, a large explosion occurred at the refinery in what was described as a major industrial accident by both local and national news. The explosion, caused by a fire, occurred around 1AM and seriously injured five workers, four of which were airlifted to the hospital with one being transported by ambulance. No fatalities were reported. Two of the injured contract workers have filed a $10 million lawsuit against ExxonMobil and partner Team Industrial Services for unsafe working conditions as of a result of the explosion.

References

External links
Aerial view of Baytown Refinery on Google Maps

Oil refineries in Texas
Buildings and structures in Harris County, Texas
ExxonMobil buildings and structures
Galveston Bay Area
Energy infrastructure completed in 1919
1919 establishments in Texas